East End Historic District is a national historic district located at Charleston, West Virginia.  The district is set on a broad, ancient flood plain bordered by the Great Kanawha River on the south and by commercialized Washington Street on the north.

The West Virginia State Capitol complex forms an axis between the two important residential East End neighborhoods. The Statehouse dominates the vistas from all directions in the district. Holly Grove Mansion, constructed in 1815, is the oldest house in the East End. The East End displays a variety of architectural styles ranging from isolated surviving examples of the Greek Revival to the late Victorian Queen Anne.  Also included, primarily in the western section, are examples of the eclectic style of the second half of the 19th century to the revivals of the pre-World War I period. Interspersed is a variety of adaptations and elements of almost every style: Italianate, Eastlake, Shingle, and Romanesque features being more prevalent in the western area, while the Georgian, Neo-Classical, Jacobethan, Prairie and Bungaloid are more often seen toward the eastern section.

Buildings are predominantly of brick, but there are a number of frame and stuccoed dwellings. Most buildings are single or double family dwellings of two or two and a half stories; exceptions are primarily apartment units of from three to six floors that blend quite well rather than more modern intrusions.

It was listed on the National Register of Historic Places in 1971, and was increased in size in 2011.

References

Houses in Charleston, West Virginia
Greek Revival architecture in West Virginia
Historic districts in Charleston, West Virginia
Houses on the National Register of Historic Places in West Virginia
National Register of Historic Places in Charleston, West Virginia
Queen Anne architecture in West Virginia
Victorian architecture in West Virginia
Historic districts on the National Register of Historic Places in West Virginia